Casalserugo is a comune (municipality) in the Province of Padua in the Italian region Veneto, located about  southwest of Venice and about  southeast of Padua.

Casalserugo borders the following municipalities: Albignasego, Bovolenta, Cartura, Maserà di Padova, Polverara, Ponte San Nicolò.

Demographic evolution

Twin towns
Casalserugo is twinned with:

  Pola de Siero, Spain, since 2010

References

External links
 www.comune.casalserugo.pd.it/

Cities and towns in Veneto